Pieces of Dreams may refer to:

 Pieces of Dreams (album), album by Stanley Turrentine
 Pieces of Dreams (film), 1970 American film